WFAH-LP (102.1 FM) is a low power radio station in Flint, Michigan with a variety format licensed to the Greater Flint Arts Council.  Its 60 watt,  transmitter is near the intersection of West Carpenter Road and Martin Luther King Avenue in Flint's northwest side.

External links

FAH-LP
FAH-LP
Radio stations established in 2016
2016 establishments in Michigan